El Shaddai is a Judaic name for God.

El Shaddai may also refer to:

Shaddai (disambiguation), a Semitic Bronze Age city and the deity worshipped there
El Shaddai (movement), a Catholic Charismatic Renewal movement
El Shaddai International Christian Centre, a group of churches
El Shaddai Charitable Trust, a charity dedicated to helping street children in India
"El Shaddai" (song), a Contemporary Christian song
El Shaddai: Ascension of the Metatron, an action video game for the PlayStation 3 and Xbox 360

See also
God Almighty (disambiguation)